Lina Loos (née Carolina Catharina Obertimpfler; 9 October 1882, in Vienna – 6 June 1950, in Vienna) was an Austrian cabaret actress and feuilleton journalist. She is best remembered for her appearances at the Linden-Cabaret in Berlin, and for her posthumous collection of writings edited by Adolf Opel. She was briefly married to Adolf Loos. Her life was the subject of the German film Lina (2017).

References 

1882 births
1950 deaths
Austrian actresses
Austrian journalists